Gordon Corson Clark (born May 31, 1952 in Glasgow, Scotland, United Kingdom and raised in Saint John, New Brunswick) is a retired ice hockey right winger. He played 8 games in the National Hockey League for the Boston Bruins and 21 in the WHA for the Cincinnati Stingers between 1974 and 1979. He was the assistant coach for the Boston Bruins for a few years in the early 1990s. He is currently the Director of Player Personnel for the New York Rangers. He won a Calder Cup as a member of the American Hockey League (AHL) champion Maine Mariners.

Career statistics

Regular season and playoffs

Awards and honors

See also
List of National Hockey League players from the United Kingdom

References

External links
 

1952 births
Living people
AHCA Division I men's ice hockey All-Americans
New Hampshire Wildcats men's ice hockey players
Boston Bruins coaches
Boston Bruins draft picks
Boston Bruins players
Boston Bruins scouts
Canadian ice hockey coaches
Canadian ice hockey right wingers
Cincinnati Stingers players
Maine Mariners players
New York Islanders coaches
New York Islanders executives
New York Rangers executives
New York Rangers scouts
Rochester Americans players
SC Riessersee players
Scottish emigrants to Canada
Sportspeople from Glasgow
Sportspeople from Saint John, New Brunswick